Zenamorpha is a monotypic moth genus of the family Crambidae described by Hans Georg Amsel in 1956. Its single species, Zenamorpha discophoralis, described by George Hampson in 1899, is found in Orizaba, Mexico.

Former species
Zenamorpha pseudonoctua (Rothschild, 1921)

References

Spilomelinae
Moths of Central America
Crambidae genera
Taxa named by Hans Georg Amsel
Monotypic moth genera